Eilema maculosa is a moth of the  subfamily Arctiinae. It was described by Saalmüller in 1884. It is found in Madagascar.

References

maculosa
Moths described in 1884